Stillhouse Hollow is a valley in Stone County in the U.S. state of Missouri.

Stillhouse Hollow was so named on account of a stillhouse the valley once contained.

References

Valleys of Stone County, Missouri
Valleys of Missouri